Laura E. Foster (1871 - September 23, 1920) was an American artist, known for her illustrations and cartoons.

Foster was born in 1871 in San Francisco. Foster lived and worked in San Francisco until the earthquake of 1906, after which she moved to New York City. In 1908, she married Donald C. Monroe, but continued to work under her unmarried name.

As a professional cartoonist, her work appeared in Life, the Saturday Evening Post and other periodicals. Foster's work was often related to women's suffrage and she created images that were both pro- and anti-suffragist.  

Foster died on September 23, 1920 after an operation.

References 

1871 births
1920 deaths
American women illustrators
American women cartoonists
People from San Francisco
Artists from New York City
American women artists